Aydın Uslupehlivan (born 1 January 1954) is a Turkish politician from the Republican People's Party (CHP). He has served as a Member of Parliament for Adana since 7 June 2015.

Born in Adana, Uslupehlivan graduated from Çukurova University as an engineer and worked in the private sector for 26 years.

Politics 

He began his political career in the CHP at the age of 22, first as a member of the party's youth wing and later as a municipal councillor for the Seyhan and Adana Municipalities after the 2014 local elections. He served as the Deputy Mayor of Seyhan before being elected as a CHP Member of Parliament at the June 2015 general election.

See also
25th Parliament of Turkey

References

External links
 Relevant news items at Haberler.com
 Relevant news items at Son Dakika

Contemporary Republican People's Party (Turkey) politicians
Deputies of Adana
Members of the 25th Parliament of Turkey
Living people
People from Adana
1954 births
Members of the 26th Parliament of Turkey